Acting Ki Funshaala is an Indian stand-up comedy television series which premiered on 1 February 2008 on SAB TV. The format of the show was conceptualized in the format of an acting school where ten contestants selected from all over India undertake a series of hilarious tasks. The show was hosted by Annu Kapoor.

References

External links
News Article on Times of India

Sony SAB original programming
Indian comedy television series
Indian stand-up comedy television series
2008 Indian television series debuts
2008 Indian television series endings